NGC 3239 is an irregular galaxy in the constellation of Leo. It is the host of SN 2012A, the first supernova of 2012. The galaxy, which was discovered in 1784 by William Herschel, is part of the New Galactic Catalogue, and with an apparent magnitude of 13.5, is not visible to the naked eye. It has been shown to have many HII regions, while also having some star formation regions. These signs are common in galactic mergers, which is why it is believed that NGC 3239 is the result of a galactic merger. The supernova SN 2012A was discovered in this galaxy and has been classified as a type II-P supernova, with a shorter plateau and non-constant luminosity.

References

External links 
 

Leo (constellation)
Irregular galaxies
263
3239
Astronomical objects discovered in 1784
Discoveries by William Herschel
030560